NRP Bartolomeu Dias was a sloop of the Portuguese Navy. These ships were classified, by the Portuguese Navy, as avisos coloniais de 1ª classe (colonial aviso 1st class) and were designed for colonial service in the Overseas territories of Portugal.

Following the failed 1936 Naval Revolt, an investigation was opened into discipline aboard the ship.

References 
http://areamilitar.org/DIRECTORIO/NAV.aspx?NN=128

Citations 

1934 ships
Naval ships of Portugal
Ships built on the River Tyne